JurisTech (Juris Technologies Sdn Bhd) is a Malaysian Financial technology company that serves banks in Malaysia with their predictive artificial intelligence system  debt collection systems, loan origination systems, credit scoring systems, conveyancing and loan documentation systems.

JurisTech started off in 1997, during the Asian Financial Crisis, offering data mining and analytical tools that might help banks generate more sales. However, the company's initial offering of data mining services was not very popular, due to the rising bad debt during that period. The company then started offering credit management and litigation software. Their debt recovery software solution was a success, which resulted in JurisTech becoming an MSC Malaysia company in 2003.

In 2014, JurisTech was selected at the New York City International Selection Panel to be a part of the Endeavor (non-profit) network.

JurisTech has also been used as an example of agile responsiveness in Chris Zook and James Allen's book The Founder's Mentality in 2016.

In 2019, JurisTech was recognized by The Star (Malaysia) for best innovation and best use of technology.

References

1997 establishments in Malaysia
Companies based in Kuala Lumpur
Financial services companies of Malaysia
Financial technology companies
Malaysian brands